Elizabeth Musoke is an Ugandan justice of the Supreme Court of Uganda , since November 2022.

Background and education
She was born and educated in Uganda for he pre-university education. She earned a Bachelor of Laws (LLB) degree from Makerere University, the nation's oldest and largest public University. She also obtained a Diploma in Legal Practice, from the Law Development Centre, in Kampala, the country's capital city. She was admitted to the Uganda Bar as a practicing lawyer.

Career
She’s  worked with the ministry of justice for several years and left at the rank of Principal State Attorney to join the Inspectorate of Government as Director Legal Affairs in 1999.

In July 2013, she was appointed to serve as a judge of the High Court of Uganda, assigned to the civil division, serving in that capacity until October 2015, when she was elevated to the Court of Appeal, which doubles as the Constitutional Court of Uganda.

In November 2022, she was appointed by H.E Yoweri Kaguta Museveni to the Supreme Court as a justice of the High Court until date. She is among the 10 Justices of The Supreme Court Of Uganda

See also
 Hellen Obura
 Supreme Court of Uganda

References

External links
Parliament vets 11 justices

Living people
Year of birth missing (living people)
Makerere University alumni
20th-century Ugandan lawyers
21st-century Ugandan judges
Law Development Centre alumni
Ugandan women judges
People from Central Region, Uganda
Justices of the Court of Appeal of Uganda
21st-century women judges